Malcolm VandenBurg is a British doctor involved in drug research, sexual health, medicolegal advice and stress management.

Medical career
VandenBurg qualified in St Bartholomew's Hospital in 1973 with a BSc in Physiology.

He lectured in medicine, as an Honorary Senior Registrar at the London Hospital and as an Honorary Lecturer in Clinical Pharmacology at St Bartholomew's Hospital

VandenBurg is a Fellow of the Royal College of Physicians, the American College of Clinical Pharmacology and the Faculty of Pharmaceutical Medicine

He established the London Hospital Hypertension Clinic in 1975.

Research
VandenBurg was director of cardiovascular research, Old Church Hospital Romford (1984–1996) and director of clinical research at Merck Sharpe & Dohme (1980–1984)

In 1996 he was appointed president and chief executive officer of global research consultancy IBRD – Rostrum Inc.

VandenBurg has coordinated drug development programmes for over 30 pharmaceutical products and has over 100 publications in the field of clinical research.

Medicolegal Work

VandenBurg is a registered expert witness who has given medicolegal advice to courts, authorities and media in a number of high-profile cases.

He has written in the BMJ about the medicolegal implications of newer SSRIs and of driving while under the influence of cannabis

VandenBurg was an expert witness in the case of the Death of Sean Rigg in police custody in 2008. He also advised the Northern Ireland Prisoner Ombudsman on the deaths of Aaron Hogg in Maghaberry Prison in 2011. and Frances McKeown in Hydebank Wood Prison, both in 2011.

VandenBurg advised the UK press on the use of propofol in the Death of Michael Jackson.

Key Publications

Books

Positive Under Pressure jointly authored with Gael Lindenfield, published by Avenue Books (24 April 2006)
Dilemmas and Solutions in Global Drug Development, published by Brookwood Medical Publications (January 2003)
Good Clinical Practice for Investigators, ROSTRUM Publications (July 1990)

References

External links
 Malcolm VandenBurg Official site

Living people
20th-century British medical doctors
Year of birth missing (living people)